Banganapalle State was one of the princely states of India during the period of the British Raj. The state was founded in 1665 and had its capital in Banganapalle. Its rulers were Shia Muslims and the last one signed the accession to the Indian Union on 23 February 1948.

See also
Nawab of Masulipatam
Masulipatam
Nizam of Hyderabad
Formation of Andhra Pradesh

References

Princely states of India
Muslim princely states of India
Shia dynasties
History of Andhra Pradesh
Kurnool district
1665 establishments in India
1948 disestablishments in India